Parallel Play is the debut extended play by New York City based synthpop band, Panama Wedding. It was released through Glassnote Records on June 3, 2014.

Track listing

All songs written by Peter Kirk

"All of the People" – 3:36
"Uma" – 3:36
"Trust" – 3:53
"Feels Like Summer" – 4:10

Charting

References 

Panama Wedding albums
2014 debut EPs
Synth-pop EPs